Vasconcellea goudotiana (also known as papayuelo) is a species of flowering plant in the family Caricaceae. It is endemic to Colombia. The plant has a chromosome count of 2n = 18.

It was previously placed in genus Carica.

Gallery

References

goudotiana